The Hayk Mirzayans Insect Museum (HMIM) is the largest insect collection in Iran with over 4 million insect specimens, including 20–25,000 local species, hundreds of primary types and paratypes, and a representative collection of exotic insects, especially tropical butterflies.

History
In 1943, Iranian entomologist JaIaI Afshar established a small entomology laboratory in the then Ministry of Agriculture in Tehran. Soon after, several Russian entomologists such as Drs. Alexandrov, Chovachin and Kiriokhin began collaborating with the lab. In 1945, a small group of fresh graduate students, including Ghodratollah Farahbakhsh and Hayk Mirzayans, joined the lab.

Beside his regular duties in the lab and involvement in Corn Bug and locust eradication programs, Mirzayans began collecting and identifying all kinds of Iranian insects, and with the help of his Russian colleagues laid the foundation of what later became the largest insect museum in the country. Despite logistic and budgetary restrictions at the time, Mirzayans conducted several collecting trip across Iran, and his specimens from 1945 became the first to be deposited in the insect collection.

During the next decades, Mirzayans restlessly continued collecting and identifying the Iranian insects. Many of his friends and colleagues also played important roles in the growth and improvement of the collection.

After the foundation of Plant Pests and Diseases Research Institute (PPDRI, now IRIPP, Iranian Research Institute of Plant Protection) in 1962, the lab was renamed to Laboratory of Entomology and Plant protection, and the relatively large insect collection (~50,000 specimens at the time) became part of the Insect Taxonomy Research Department (ITRD) on the third floor of the Institute’s main building.

It was in the period when, with the recruitment of a new generation of young entomologists as well as technicians to do curatorial work, the museum saw an exponential growth and improvement. In a span of about 15 years, the collection grew to hold ~2 million specimens. Renowned entomologists such as Jean Barou (Lepidoptera, France), Eugenio Morales Agacino (Orthoptera, Spain), Gunther Ebert and Heinz Falkner (Lepidoptera), Arthur G. Lavallee (Diptera) and others were contracted by the department, and many others (such as H. G. Amsel, Petrovich, …) visited the collection and contributed to its improvement. Several major expeditions across Iran were conducted together with international teams, including with the Czechoslovakian entomologists (1972, 1975, 1977), resulting in an immense increase in understanding of the Iranian Insect fauna. Internationally, HMIM became well known under its departmental acronym, PPDRI, or the Evin Institute.

In 1972, ITRD and the collection were moved to the second floor of the newly constructed building that also housed the Botany and Agricultural Zoology Departments. 120 high quality new insect cabinets (40 drawers each, based on a German model) were built by the Iran Industrial School and were added to the museum.

After the Islamic Revolution in 1979, and with the retirement of a large group of researchers, the ITRD staff was reduced to only a few people, and the international collaborations were minimized. It took a decade before the department was fully re-staffed and research activities were resumed.

In the spring of 1999, after the death of Hayk Mirzayans, with the proposal of the then Agricultural Minister, the collection was named the Hayk Mirzayans Insect Museum (HMIM). Today the collection holds about 4 million specimens, containing many type specimens and has been declared a national treasure.

Research
Identification of insect fauna of Iran is the main objective of HMIM, and the Insect Taxonomy Research Department remains the main authoritative source for insect identification in Iran. With the ongoing activities in this regard and especially the implementation of projects such as "Investigation, Collecting and Identification of Insect Fauna of Iran" since 1968, these studies have continued to accelerate.

The HMIM insect collection is spread over four main collection halls: Lepidoptera, Coleoptera, Orthoptera and Hymenoptera/Diptera. In addition to the HMIM insect collection halls, the Insect Taxonomy Research Department includes specialized taxonomy laboratories for Coleoptera, Lepidoptera, Orthoptera, Diptera, Hemiptera and Isoptera; a research library, and a web room. The headquarters and the library of the Entomological Society of Iran (ESI) are also located in ITRD.

Beside basic taxonomic research and collaborations, HMIM welcomes numerous entomology students and research affiliates every year, advises the MSc, PhD students’ theses, offers training courses, and helps other scientific research centers in completion and maintenance of their insect collections. ITRD acts as the National Identification Service for governmental or non-governmental organizations, publishes various articles, reports, books, data banks and checklists of its holdings, and provides these information free of charge to all visitors.

References

1945 establishments in Iran
Museums established in 1945
Insect museums
Museums in Tehran
Mirzayans, Hayk
Insects in culture